Dustin Kelm is a professional world champion and world record setting unicyclist, performing the UniShow around the world.  He has performed and competed throughout North, South and Central America, Europe, Asia, Africa and the Caribbean.  Dustin is a three time Unicycling Society of America expert freestyle national champion, a Unicycling Society of America mountain unicycling national champion and a UNICON freestyle World Champion.

He was born January 26, 1972, and was given his first unicycle at the age of 10.  Two years later he joined the Twin Cities Unicycle Club in Minneapolis and discovered there was much more he could do on a unicycle besides his paper route.  Over the years he has claimed national and world records, titles and medals in age group categories as well as men's expert categories.

Dustin was elected to serve on the board of directors for the Unicycling Society of America for two three year terms (1989–1991, 1993–1995).

USA national awards and titles 
1986 Bowling Green, Ohio - Unicycling Society of America National Unicycle Convention
Overall winner 13-14 Male (55 Points)
Individual Standard Class National Champion 13-14 Male (52.00)
Artistic Riding Couples 3rd Place 15-16 Male (47.66) 
100m National Champion 13-14 Male (0:17.67)
200m National Champion 13-14 Male (0:34.74)
1600m National Champion 13-14 Male (5:15:32)
50m One-footed Race National Champion 13-14 Male and Unicycling Society of America National Unicycle Convention Age Group Record (0:10.31) 
Backwards 50m Race National Champion 13-14 Male (0:12.78)
Slow Race National Champion 13-14 Male (0:11.96)
Obstacle Course 2nd Place 13-14 Male (0:24.47)
Relay 2nd Place 13-16 Male
Wheel Walk National Champion 13-14 Male (0:04.79)

1987 Arden Hills, Minnesota - Unicycling Society of America National Unicycle Convention 
Overall Race Trophy 15-16 Male (35 Points)
100m National Champion 15-16 Male (0:16.53)
200m National Champion 15-16 Male (0:34.50)
1600m National Champion 15-16 Male (5:04.38)
Obstacle Course National Champion 15-16 Male (0:25.07)
One-footed 50m Race National Champion 15-16 Male (0:09.70)
Backwards 50m Race National Champion 15-16 Male (0:11.31)
Forward Slow 10m Race National Champion 15-16 Male (0:27.10)
Ultimate Wheel 10m Race National Champion 15-16 Male and World Champion (0:03.85)  
Individual Trick Riding 2nd Place 15-16 Male

1988 Ypsilanti, Michigan - Unicycling Society of America National Unicycle Convention 
Artistic Riding Open Class National Champion 15-16 Male
Artistic Riding Couples 2nd Place 17-18 Male
100m National Champion 15-16 Male (0:16.24)
1600m National Champion 15-16 Male (5:02.00)
Obstacle Course 2nd Place 15-16 Male
One-footed Race National Champion 15-16 Male (0:10.03)
Forward Slow Race National Champion 15-16 Male (0:15.27)
Backward Slow Race National Champion 15-16 Male (0:15.68)
Wheel Walk 2nd Place 15-16 Male

1989 Mobile, Alabama - Unicycling Society of America National Unicycle Convention 
Over-all High Point Winner 17-18 Male
200m National Champion 17-18 Male and Unicycling Society of America National Unicycle Convention Age Group Record (0:31.13) 
1600m National Champion 17-18 Male, Unicycling Society of America National Unicycle Convention Age Group Record  and World Record (4:46.44) 
Ultimate Wheel 25m National Champion and World Record (0:06.86)

1990 Findlay, Ohio - Unicycling Society of America National Unicycle Convention 
Artistic Riding Open Class National Champion 17-18 Male
Artistic Riding Couples National Champion 19-29 Male
Over-all High Point Winner 17-18 Male
100m National Champion 17-18 Male and Unicycling Society of America National Unicycle Convention Age Group Record (0:15.32)
200m National Champion 17-18 Male (0:33.88)
1600m National Champion 17-18 Male (4:48.74)
Obstacle Course National Champion 17-18 Male (0:23.27)
Forward Slow Race National Champion 17-18 Male (0:30.52)
Ultimate Wheel National Champion 17-18 Male (0:07.29)
Wheel Walk National Champion 17-18 Male(0:09.41)

1991 Chariton, Iowa - Unicycling Society of America National Unicycle Convention 
Men's Expert Freestyle 2nd Place

1992 Saint Paul, Minnesota - Unicycling Society of America National Unicycle Convention 
Over-all High Point Winner Expert Male

1992 Quebec, Canada - UNICON VI 
Downhill Gliding World Champion (0:47.9)

1994 Wahpeton, North Dakota - Unicycling Society of America National Unicycle Convention 
Backwards Slow Race National Champion Expert Male and Unicycling Society of America National Unicycle Convention Age Group Record (0:26.03) 

1994 Minneapolis, Minnesota - UNICON VII
Obstacle Course 2nd Place 19-29 Male (0:22:92)
Obstacle Course 3rd Place Expert Male (0:22:92)
Backward Slow Race World Champion 19-29 Male (0:33:86)
Backward Slow Race World Champion Expert Male and International Unicycle Federation World Record (0:33:86)
Forward Slow Race 1st Place 19-29 Male (0:35:61)
Forward Slow Race 2nd Place Expert Male (0:35:61)
Backward Slow Race World Champion Expert Male (0:33:86)
Ultimate Wheel 30m World Champion 19-29 Male (0:07:90)
Ultimate Wheel 30m World Champion Expert Male (0:07:90)
Wheel Walk Race 2nd Place 19-29 Male (0:08:00)
Gliding 2nd Place Expert Male (20.06m)

1995 Bowling Green, Ohio - Unicycling Society of America National Unicycle Convention 
Overall Racing Expert Male 3rd Place
100m 2nd Place 19-29 Male (0:16.15)
200 3rd Place Expert Male (0:32.09)
200 National Champion 19-29 Male (0:32.02)
400m 2nd Place Expert Male (1:08.38)
400m National Champion 19-29 Male (1:12.26)
Obstacle Course 2nd Place 19-29 Male (0:23.43)
One-footed Race 2nd Place 19-29 Male (0:09.99)
Backward Slow 10m Race National Champion 19-29 Male (0:32.33)
Backward Slow 10m Race National Champion Expert Male and Unicycling Society of America National Unicycle Convention Overall Record (0:32.33) 
Forward Slow Race 3rd Place Expert Male (0:29.34)
Forward Slow Race National Champion 19-29 Male (0:29.34)
Ultimate Wheel 30m National Champion Expert Male (0:08.32)
Ultimate Wheel 30m National Champion 19-29 Male (0:08.32) 
Wheel Walk Race National Champion 19-29 Male (0:12.55)
Height Hopping National Champion 19-29 Male (.356m)

1996 Chariton, Iowa - Unicycling Society of America National Unicycle Convention
Men's Expert Freestyle National Champion 
100m 3rd Place Expert Male (0:15.53)
100m 2nd Place 19-29 Male (0:15.54)
200m 2nd Place 19-29 Male (0:32.53)
400m 2nd Place 19-29 Male (1:05.66)
1600m 2nd Place Expert Male (4:44.40)
1600m 2nd Place 19-29 Male (4:44.40)
Coasting Distance Event 2nd Place Expert Male (47.80m)
Coasting Distance Event National Champion 19-29 Male (47.80m)
Obstacle Course 3rd Place Expert Male (0:23.35)
Obstacle Course 2nd Place 19-29 Male (0:23.35)
One-footed Race 2nd Place 19-29 Male (0:10.64)
Backward Slow Race 2nd Place Expert Male (0:29.21)
Backward Slow Race National Champion 19-29 Male (0:29.21)
Forward Slow Race National Champion 19-29 Male (0:24.05)
Ultimate Wheel Race National Champion Expert Male (0:07.36)
Ultimate Wheel Race National Champion 19-29 Male (0:07.36)
Wheel Walk Race 3rd Place Expert Male (0:10.14)
Wheel Walk Race National Champion 19-29 Male (0:12.29)

1997 St. Paul, Minnesota - Unicycling Society of America National Unicycle Convention 
Artistic Freestyle 2nd Place Expert Male  
Artistic Pairs Freestyle 2nd Place Expert 
Coasting Distance Event 2nd Place Expert Male (66.09m)
Coasting Distance Event National Champion 19-29 Male (66.09m)

1998 Monrovia, California - Unicycling Society of America National Unicycle Convention
Men's Expert Freestyle National Champion
Mountain Unicycling National Champion Expert Male 
Mountain Unicycling National Champion 19-29 Male
1600m 3rd Place Expert Male (4:48.14)
1600m 3rd Place 19-29 Male (4:48.14)
Coasting Distance Event 3rd Place Expert Male (52.61m)
Coasting Distance Event 2nd Place 19-29 Male (52.61m)
Obstacle Course 3rd Place 19-29 Male (0:24.78)
Backward Slow Race 3rd Place Expert Male (0:24.66)
Backward Slow Race National Champion 19-29 Male (0:24.66)
Forward Slow Race 3rd Place Expert Male (0:29.16)
Forward Slow Race National Champion 19-29 Male (0:29.16)
Height Hopping National Champion Expert Male (.50m)
Height Hopping National Champion 19-29 Male (.50m)

1998 Bottrop, Germany - UNICON IX 
Men's Expert Freestyle World Champion
Artistic Pairs Freestyle 2nd Place Expert

1999 Snoqualmie, Washington - Unicycling Society of America National Unicycle Convention 
Men's Expert Freestyle National Champion 
400m 2nd Place 19-29 Male (1:08.06)
1600m 3rd Place 19-29 Male (5:02.30)
High Jump 3rd Place 19-29 Male (.28m)
One-footed 50m Race 2nd Place 19-29 Male (0:09.73)
Backward Slow Race National Champion Expert Male (0:32.45)
Backward Slow Race National Champion 19-29 Male (0:32.45)
Forward Slow Race 3rd Place 19-29 Male (0:29.88)
Wheel Walk 3rd Place Expert Male (0:10.61)
Wheel Walk 2nd Place 19-29 Male (0:10.97)
Giraffe Backward Slow Race National Champion Expert Male (0:17.71)
Giraffe Backward Slow Race National Champion 19-29 Male (0:17.71)
Giraffe Forward Slow Race National Champion Expert Male (0:23.62)
Giraffe Forward Slow Race National Champion 19-29 Male (0:23.62)

2002 North Bend, Washington - North American Unicycling Championships and Convention 
400m National Champion 30-39 Male (1:07.67)
Wheel Walk 30m National Champion 30-39 Male (0:11.22)
Obstacle Course National Champion 30-39 Male (0:22.78)
Backward Slow Race 10m National Champion Expert Male (0:31.80)
Backward Slow Race 10m National Champion 30-39 Male (0:31.80)
Forward Slow Race 10m National Champion Expert Male (0:31.57)
Forward Slow Race 10m National Champion 30-39 Male (0:31.57)
Wheel Walk 30m Race National Champion 30-30 Male (0:11.22)
High Jump National Champion 30-39 Male (.45m)
Long Jump National Champion 30-39 Male (1.56m)

2014 Bloomington, Minnesota - North American Unicycling Championships and Conventions
100m 2nd Place Expert Male (0:17.006)
100m National Champion 30-49 Male (0:17.468)
400m 2nd Place Expert Male (1:09.298)
400m 2nd Place 30-49 Male (1:10.129)
800m 3rd Place Expert Male (2:27.596)
800m 2nd Place 30-49 Male (2:31.668)
Wheel Walk 30m National Champion 30-49 Male (0:17.162)
IUF Slalom 3rd Place Expert Male (0:25.190)
IUF Slalom 3rd Place 30-49 Male (0:25.190)
One-footed Race 3rd Place Expert Male (0:11.377)
One-footed Race 2nd Place 30-49 Male (0:11.097)
Criterium Unlimited 2nd Place 35-49 Male (13:18)
Time Trial 2nd Place 35-49 Male (51:29)
10k 2nd Place 35-49 Male (25:42)
Marathon 2nd Place 35-49 Male (2:17:29)

Other competitions 
2004 - First place in Collins Cycles Extreme Freeride competition in Eugene, Oregon
2008 - Competed in the 800 kilometer Ride the Lobster unicycle race across Nova Scotia, Canada

RefugeRide 

Dustin and his wife Katie accomplished the RefugeRide from June 21 to October 9, 2013, riding big wheel unicycles coast to coast across the United States from Tybee Island, Georgia to Yachats, Oregon to raise funds for Syrian refugees.  In 97 days they rode 3,511 miles (5,650 kilometers) through 14 states, raising over $37,500.

Media appearances 

ESPN Amazing Games
Guest appearance in "Defect" extreme unicycling video by Syko Productions
"Lifeline" Pacific Broadcast Association Asian network feature
"Introduction to Unicycling" video guest instructor produced by Unicycle.com 
Sat7 broadcast throughout the Middle East of performances/interviews in Egypt and Iraq
Semi-finalist competitor on Yetenek Sizsiniz Türkiye, Turkey's highest rated TV show and a Got Talent franchise
The Beyaz Show in Turkey
Mavi Shaker (Blue Candy) in Turkey
Berdan Show Channel TRT6 in Turkey
TV7 Familja 7 Show in Albania
Numerous other radio, newspaper, magazine and television appearances in the US, Canada, England, Japan, Peru, Paraguay, Kyrgyzstan, Albania and Turkey

References

External links 
Dustin Kelm UniShow website
Dustin Kelm RefugeRide website

1972 births
Artists from Minneapolis
Unicyclists
American entertainers
American performance artists
Living people